Raymond Ausloos (3 February 1930 – 1 December 2012) was a Belgian football goalkeeper who was a member of the Belgium national team at the 1954 FIFA World Cup. However, he never earned a cap for Belgium. He also played for R. White Daring Molenbeek.

References

External links
FIFA profile

1930 births
2012 deaths
Belgian footballers
Association football goalkeepers
1954 FIFA World Cup players